Daptone Records is a funk and soul independent record label based in Brooklyn, New York. Best known as the home of Sharon Jones & The Dap-Kings and Charles Bradley, the label boasts a roster which includes Menahan Street Band, The Budos Band, The Sugarman 3, and Antibalas, and runs the recording studio Daptone's House of Soul.

History 
Daptone Records was formed in 2001 by Gabriel Roth (Bosco Mann) and Neal Sugarman. Daptone was born out of the closure of Desco Records, a label run by Roth with fellow musician Philip Lehman who both played in the band Soul Providers. Roth and Lehman ended their band and business relationship in 2000. Roth, who had played with Sharon Jones as part of the Soul Providers, subsequently founded a new label with Neal Sugarman, leader of The Sugarman 3, as the home of their new group, Sharon Jones & the Dap-Kings.

Their first release was 2002's Dap Dippin' with Sharon Jones and the Dap-Kings. In their first four years, Daptone would also put out Sharon Jones' sophomore album, Naturally, as well as original releases by the Sugarman 3 and Dap-Kings-adjacent The Budos Band.

During this time, they also converted a two-family home in Bushwick, Brooklyn into an analog recording studio space. Producer Mark Ronson became a fan of the studio. He brought in Amy Winehouse to record parts of her album Back to Black there with The Dap-Kings. The Dap-Kings would tour with Winehouse in 2007.

In addition to Sharon Jones & The Dap-Kings, Daptone has recorded and released the music of Antibalas, The Sugarman 3, The Budos Band, The Poets of Rhythm, The Mystery Lights, The Daktaris, The Mighty Imperials, Lee Fields, Charles Bradley, Binky Griptite, The Sha La Das, and Naomi Davis. The Daptone Record label is inexorably tied to Sharon Jones. The label and members of her band were with her during the last weeks before her death.

Since its founding, Daptone has released over one hundred 45" singles and fifty albums.

Imprints 
As of 2021, Daptone operates four specialty imprints.

 Ever-Soul, an imprint that reissues rare soul singles from the 1960s and 1970s.
 Dunham, a label run by Thomas Brenneck and Homer Steinweiss, best known for their releases of Charles Bradley and Menahan Street Band.
 Penrose, a South California offshoot of Daptone began by Bosco Mann in 2020.
 Wick, a subsidiary founded in the late 2010s with a roster of  rock-leaning artists.

Recording studios 
Daptone built their studio, called Daptone's House of Soul, in a converted two-family home in the Bushwick neighborhood of Brooklyn. It was very run down when they first rented it, and the neighborhood was not great. Daptone Records has its offices in the top floor, the studio is on the ground floor. The label built the studio from scratch, and made the decision to not have computers, but to rely completely on the more old-fashioned analog recording methods to make music. There are tape machines and a CD recorder, but no Pro Tools or digital reverbs.

The studio is where they have recorded most of their releases. Their distinctive sound is a product of the studio acoustics, recording only on analog tape (no digital), and mixing done by Roth. The recording studio and engineering personnel have been sought out by record producers such as Mark Ronson.

In February 2009, Daptone's House of Soul was broken into and thieves made off with the better part of its equipment.

Artists
 Adam Scone
 Antibalas
 Benjamin & the Right Direction
 Bob & Gene
 Charles Bradley
Cochemea
 Lee Fields
 Menahan Street Band
 Naomi Shelton & The Gospel Queens
 Orquesta Akokán
 Saun and Starr AKA "The Dap-ettes"
 Sharon Jones & The Dap-Kings
 The Budos Band
 The Como Mamas
 The Frightnrs
 The James Hunter Six
 The Mighty Imperials
 The Sugarman 3
 The Olympians
 The Sha La Das
 Thee Sacred Souls

Wick imprint artists
 The Ar-Kaics
The Jay-Vons
 The Mystery Lights
 Michael Rault

Discography

Notable awards 
Grammy Awards

 2021: Antibalas, Fu Chronicles – Best Global Music Album (nominated)
 2019: Orquesta Akokán, Orquesta Akokán – Best Tropical Latin Album (nominated)
 2014: Sharon Jones & the Dap-Kings, Give The People What They Want – Best R&B Album (nominated)

A2IM Libera Awards

 2021: Antibalas, Fu Chronicles – Best World Record
2021: Label of the Year (Small)
2019: Orquesta Akokán, Orquesta Akokán – Best Latin Album (nominated)
 2019: Charles Bradley, Black Velvet – Best R&B Album (won)
 2019: Charles Bradley, Black Velvet Deluxe – Creative Packaging (nominated)
 2019: Label of the Year (Small) (won)
 2018: Sharon Jones & the Dap-Kings, Soul of a Woman – Best R&B Album (won)
 2018: Label of the Year (Small) (won)
 2017: Charles Bradley, Changes – Best Blues/Jazz/R&B Album (won)
 2017: Charles Bradley – Best Live Act (nominated)
 2017: Sharon Jones & the Dap-Kings (Neal Sugarman) – Best Sync Usage (won)
 2017: Label of the Year (Small) (won)
 2017: Charles Bradley, Changes – Marketing Genius (nominated)
 2016: Label of the Year (Small) (won)
 2015: Sharon Jones & The Dap-Kings – Hardest Working Artist (won)
 2015: Naomi Shelton & The Gospel Queens, Cold World – Best Heritage Album (nominated)
 2015: Label of the Year (Small) (nominated)
 2014: Sharon Jones & the Dap-Kings, "Retreat" – Video of the Year (nominated)
 2014: Charles Bradley – Hardest Working Artist (won)
 2014: Charles Bradley – Best Live Act (nominated)
 2014: Label of the Year (Small) (won) 
 2013: Antibalas, “Dirty Money” – Video of the Year (nominated)
 2013: Label of the Year (Small) (nominated)
 2012: Charles Bradley – Road Warrior of the Year (won)
 2012: Label of the Year (Small) (won)

See also 
 Daptone Records artists
 Daptone Records albums
 Bosco Mann
 Sharon Jones
 Sharon Jones & The Dap-Kings
Truth & Soul Records

References

Further reading 
 
 Lipsky, Jessica, "Dap-Dipping: Creating Daptone's House of Soul" (September 14, 2021)

External links

 
 
 Dunham Records
 EVER-SOUL Records

 
American independent record labels
Soul music record labels
2001 establishments in New York City
Record labels established in 2001
Companies based in Brooklyn